Craig Robinson (30 July 1985) is an English professional rugby league footballer who has played in the 2000s and 2010s.

References

External links
Doncaster RLFC profile
Statistics at orl-heritagetrust.org.uk

1986 births
Living people
Doncaster R.L.F.C. players
English rugby league players
Hunslet R.L.F.C. players
Oldham R.L.F.C. players
Place of birth missing (living people)
Rochdale Hornets players
Rugby league locks
Rugby league props
Rugby league second-rows
Wakefield Trinity players